Pascal Jean Marcel Wintzer (born 18 December 1959) is a French prelate of the Catholic Church who serves as the archbishop of Poitiers since 2012. He was previously the apostolic administrator of the same diocese from 2011 to 2012, where he also served as an auxiliary bishop from 2007 until 2011, holding the title of the titular bishop of Rusadir during the same period.

Wintzer was ordained a priest on 27 June 1987 in Rouen. He was appointed auxiliary bishop of Poitiers and the titular bishop of Rusadir on 2 April 2007. His episcopal consecration took place on 19 May 2007, and was consecrated by then archbishop of Poitiers Albert Rouet. The co-consecrators were the archbishop of Rouen Jean-Charles Descubes and Archbishop Emeritus Joseph Duval of Rouen.

After the Descubes' retirement on 12 February 2011, Wintzer was appointed the apostolic administrator of Poitiers the same day. He was appointed the archbishop of Poitiers on 13 January 2012.

In March 2019, he became the first from the French Catholic hierarchy to publicly support the idea of ordaining married men. Wintzer explained that ordaining married men would help the clergy to bring them back to "ordinary humanity", and saw it as a helpful tool in combating sexual abuse that exists among the parts of the Catholic clergy.

Notes

References

Web-sites 

 

1959 births
Living people
Bishops appointed by Pope Benedict XVI
Bishops of Poitiers
21st-century Roman Catholic archbishops in France